KBOA (1540 AM, America's Best Music) is a radio station broadcasting an Adult Standards music format. Licensed to Kennett, Missouri, United States, the station is currently owned by Pollack Broadcasting Co. and features programming from Citadel Media.

AM 1540 KBOA is simulcast on sister station 98.7 FM WGCQ.

History
The station was assigned the call sign KNNT on February 1, 1986. On January 19, 1995, the station changed its call sign to the current KBOA.

References

External links

BOA